The 2017 Montreal Impact season is the club's 24th season of existence, and their sixth in Major League Soccer, the top tier of the Canadian soccer pyramid.

Current squad
Source, As of August 10, 2017:

International roster slots 
Montreal has ten MLS International Roster Slots for use in the 2017 season. They have the eight allotted from the league and two from trades with D.C. United and Vancouver Whitecaps FC. They traded 1 slot to Vancouver Whitecaps FC on July 21.

Player Movement

In 
Per Major League Soccer and club policies terms of the deals do not get disclosed.

Out

Loans in

Loans out

Draft picks

International caps 
Players called for senior international duty during the 2017 season while under contract with the Montreal Impact.

Friendlies

Pre-Season

Mid-Season

Major League Soccer

Review

Tables

Eastern Conference

Overall

Results summary

Fixtures & results

Canadian Championship

Tournament bracket

Canadian Championship results

Statistics

Appearances, Minutes Played, and Goals Scored

Top scorers

{| class="wikitable sortable alternance"  style="font-size:85%; text-align:center; line-height:14px; width:85%;"
|-
!width=10|Rank
!width=10|Nat.
! scope="col" style="width:275px;"|Player
!width=10|Pos.
!width=80|MLS
!width=80|Canadian Champ
!width=80|MLS Playoffs
!width=80|TOTAL
|-
|1||  || Ignacio Piatti                || MF ||17 ||2 || ||19
|-
|2||  || Anthony Jackson-Hamel                || FW ||9 ||1 || || 10
|-
|3||  || Blerim Džemaili                || MF || 7||1 || ||8
|-
|4||  || Matteo Mancosu                || FW ||6 || 1|| || 7
|-
|5||  || Ballou Jean-Yves Tabla                || MF ||2 ||1 || || 3
|-
|5||  || Michael Salazar                || MF ||3 || || ||3
|-
|7||  || Marco Donadel                || MF ||2 || || || 2
|-
|7||  || Patrice Bernier                || MF ||2 || || || 2
|-
|9||  || Ambroise Oyongo                || DF ||1 || || ||1
|-
|9||  || Dominic Oduro                || FW ||1 || || ||1
|-
|9||  || David Choinière                || DF || ||1 || ||1
|-
|9||  || Chris Duvall                || DF ||1 || || ||1
|-
|9||  || Kyle Fisher                || DF ||1 || || ||1
|-
|- class="sortbottom"
| colspan="4"|Totals|| 52 || 7 ||0 ||59 

Italic: denotes player left the club during the season.

Top Assists 

{| class="wikitable sortable alternance"  style="font-size:85%; text-align:center; line-height:14px; width:85%;"
|-
!width=10|No.
!width=10|Nat.
! scope="col" style="width:275px;"|Player
!width=10|Pos.
!width=80|MLS
!width=80|Canadian Champ
!width=80|MLS Playoffs
!width=80|TOTAL
|-
|31||  || Blerim Džemaili                || MF || 10 || 1 || || 11
|-
|10||  || Ignacio Piatti                || MF || 6 ||  || || 6
|-
|24||  || Anthony Jackson-Hamel                || FW || 4 || 1 || || 5
|-
|8||  || Patrice Bernier                || MF ||4 || || ||4
|-
|30||  || Hernán Bernardello                || MF || 3 ||  || || 3
|-
|18||  || Chris Duvall                || DF || 2 ||  || || 2
|-
|19||  || Michael Salazar                || FW || 3 ||  || || 3
|-
|21||  || Matteo Mancosu                || FW || 2 ||  || || 2
|-
|2||  || Ambroise Oyongo                || DF || 1 ||  || || 1
|-
|3||  || Daniel Lovitz                || DF || 1 ||1  || || 2
|-
|13||  || Ballou Jean-Yves Tabla                || MF || 2 ||  || || 2
|-
|14||  || Adrián Arregui                || MF || 1 ||  || || 1
|-
|23||  || Laurent Ciman                || DF || 1 ||  || || 1
|-
|25||  || Louis Béland-Goyette                || MF || 1 ||  || || 1
|-
|29||  || Samuel Piette                || MF || 1 ||  || || 1
|-
|33||  || Marco Donadel                || MF || 1 ||  || || 1
|-
|- class="sortbottom"
| colspan="4"|Totals|| 42 || 3 ||0 ||45 

Italic: denotes player left the club during the season.

Multi–goal games

Goals Against Average 

{| border="1" cellpadding="4" cellspacing="0" style="margin: 1em 1em 1em 1em 0; background: #f9f9f9; border: 1px #aaa solid; border-collapse: collapse; font-size: 95%; text-align: center;"
|-
| rowspan="2" style="width:1%; text-align:center;"|No.
| rowspan="2" style="width:90px; text-align:center;"|Nat.
| rowspan="2" style="width:25%; text-align:center;"|Player
| colspan="3" style="text-align:center;"|Total
| colspan="3" style="text-align:center;"|Major League Soccer
| colspan="3" style="text-align:center;"|Canadian Championship
| colspan="3" style="text-align:center;"|MLS Playoffs
|-
|MIN
|GA
|GAA
|MIN
|GA
|GAA
|MIN
|GA
|GAA
|MIN
|GA
|GAA
|-
| style="text-align: right;" |1
|
| style="text-align: left;" |Evan Bush
|2790
|50
|1.61
|2790
|50
|1.61
|0
|0
|0.00
|0
|0
|0.00
|-
| style="text-align: right;" |22
|
| style="text-align: left;" |Eric Kronberg
|0
|0
|0.00
|0
|0
|0.00
|0
|0
|0.00
|0
|0
|0.00
|-
| style="text-align: right;" |40
|
| style="text-align: left;" |Maxime Crépeau
|630
|14
|2.00
|270
|7
|2.33
|360
|7
|1.75
|0
|0
|0.00

Italic: denotes player left the club during the season.

Clean sheets 

{| class="wikitable sortable alternance"  style="font-size:85%; text-align:center; line-height:14px; width:85%;"
|-
!width=10|No.
!width=10|Nat.
! scope="col" style="width:225px;"|Player
!width=80|MLS
!width=80|Canadian Champ
!width=80|MLS Cup Playoffs
!width=80|TOTAL
|-
|1||  || Evan Bush                     || 5 || ||   ||5
|- class="sortbottom"
| colspan="3"|Totals|| 5 || 0 ||0  || 5

Top minutes played 

{| class="wikitable sortable alternance"  style="font-size:85%; text-align:center; line-height:14px; width:80%;"
|-
!width=10|No.
!width=10|Nat.
!scope="col" style="width:275px;"|Player
!width=10|Pos.
!width=80|MLS
!width=80|Canadian Champ
!width=80|TOTAL
|-
|23||  || Laurent Ciman               || DF || 2700 || 360   || 3060
|-
|1 ||  || |Evan Bush                   || GK || 2790 ||      || 2790
|-
|10||  || Ignacio Piatti              || MF || 2368 || 260   || 2628
|-
|18||  || Chris Duvall                || DF || 2210 || 270   || 2480
|-
|8||  || Patrice Bernier              || MF || 1801  || 261  || 2062
|-
|31||  || Blerim Džemaili              || MF || 1851  || 175  || 2026
|-
|21 ||  || Matteo Mancosu             || FW || 1745  || 180  || 1925
|-
|3||  || Daniel Lovitz                 || DF || 1750  || 127  || 1877
|-
|30||  || Hernán Bernardello          || MF || 1586 || 270  || 1856
|-
|26||  || Kyle Fisher                 || DF || 1455  || 270  || 1725
|-

Italic: denotes player left the club during the season.

Yellow and red cards

Recognition

MLS Player of the Month

MLS Player of the Week

MLS Team of the Week

MLS Goal of the Week

Save of the Week

References

CF Montréal seasons
Montreal Impact
Montreal Impact
Montreal Impact